The 1926–27 season was Port Vale's eighth consecutive season of football (21st overall) in the English Football League. Vale finished in eighth position for the third season running, obtaining 45 points, this time coming nine points off promotion to the top tier in English football. For the first time in the club's history, they played in a league above rivals Stoke City. Wilf Kirkham broke a club record by scoring 38 league goals, and 41 goals in all competitions. He scored six braces, four hat-tricks, and also scored four goals in one game.

Overview

Second Division
The pre-season additions included Stoke left-half Vic Rouse and Stockport County half-back George Whitcombe.

The season started with just one defeat in the opening ten games, the defeat coming against relegation candidates Darlington. Going into October the club suffered from injuries, meaning that four of the five games that month ended in defeat, with just two goals scored. Goalkeeper Tom Fern was one of the injured, and so 44-year-old Howard Matthews was re-signed, having left the club nineteen years earlier. To boost the strike-force Stewart Littlewood and Jack Simms were signed from Luton Town and Leek Alexandra respectively. The week after a 6–2 defeat at Fulham, the "Valiants" returned to thrash Grimsby Town 6–1, Kirkham bagging a hat-trick.

In January, Alfred Strange felt unsettled and so was transferred to The Wednesday in exchange for Harry Anstiss and an unknown sum of money. Strange would later win twenty caps for England in his 30s, whereas Anstiss settled in well at the Vale, scoring eleven goals in fifteen league games during his debut season. Meanwhile, injuries occasionally savaged the Vale team, with even Jack Lowe being forced to end his run of 123 consecutive games after spraining his ankle. As the season drew to a close secretary Joe Schofield was made manager, meaning he was better able to work with the younger players.

Finances
On the financial side, the club wished to move back to the Athletic Ground due to the lack of space to develop The Old Recreation Ground. However, the council would only offer £20,000 for the land at the Old Rec, and refused to waive the first option on a repurchase, thereby killing the club's ambitions.

Cup competitions
In the FA Cup, Vale made it through to the Fourth Round after taking Clapton Orient to a replay. This came just two weeks after playing the club twice during the Christmas period. They then faced First Division Arsenal, and following a draw at The Old Recreation Ground, the "Gunners" won 1–0 at Highbury, before going on to lose in the final. Vale's hard work in the tournament earned them over £4,000 in gate receipts. On 5 May 1927, Vale played Potteries derby rivals Stoke City in the North Staffordshire Royal Infirmary Cup, and lost an embarrassing 5–0 to the Third Division North champions. However £365 was raised for the local hospital.

League table

Results
Port Vale's score comes first

Football League Second Division

Results by matchday

Matches

FA Cup

North Staffordshire Infirmary Cup

Player statistics

Appearances

Top scorers

Transfers

Transfers in

Transfers out

References
Specific

General

Port Vale F.C. seasons
Port Vale